Aymen Saleem (born January 13, 1993) is a Pakistani actress and model who appears in Urdu television shows. She made her acting debut with Hum TV's ramadan special Chupke Chupke as Ramisha aka Mishi (2020). 

In 2022, Saleem make her television comeback after one year with another ramadan drama Paristan as Pernia. Currently she was seen in feminism romance Ibn-e-Hawwa playing Aliya on Hum TV.

Early life and education
Aymen was born in Karachi. She is the niece of the late Pakistani singer Nazia Hassan. Her father, Saleem Yousuf, is a former Pakistani cricketer. She finished her A-levels at Karachi Grammar School. She earned her graduation cap in 2017 from University of Pennsylvania.

Aymen attempted for a Guinness World Record in 2010 when she fitted herself, along with 18 other girls, into a smart car with closed doors for 19 seconds.

Career
In 2020, she acted in a Hum TV production, Chupke Chupke, which aired in 2021 and starred with Ayeza Khan, Osman Khalid Butt, Arslan Naseer, and Mira Sethi.

Television

References

External links
 

1996 births
Living people
People from Karachi
Pakistani female models
21st-century Pakistani actresses
Pakistani television actresses